Mădulari is a commune located in Vâlcea County, Oltenia, Romania. It is composed of six villages: Mădulari, Bălșoara, Bănțești, Dimulești, Iacovile and Mamu.

References

Communes in Vâlcea County
Localities in Oltenia